CPS1 may refer to:

CPS-1, the Capcom Play System 1
Parry Sound Harbour Water Aerodrome, the IATA airport code
Carbamoyl phosphate synthase